Ponte a Elsa is a town in Tuscany, central Italy, administratively a frazione of the comuni of Empoli (Metropolitan City of Florence) and San Miniato (province of Pisa). At the time of the 2011 census its population was 3,609.

References 

Frazioni of the Province of Florence
Frazioni of the Province of Pisa